Magny-les-Hameaux is a commune in the Yvelines department in the Île-de-France region in north-central France.

Population

Education
There are four preschools:  Ecole Francis Jammes, Ecole André Gide, Ecole Petit Prince, and Ecole Jean Baptiste Corot. There are five elementary schools:  Ecole Rosa Bonheur, Ecole Albert Samain, Ecole Saint Exupéry, Ecole André Gide, and Ecole Louise Weiss. The school assignments for preschool and elementary are determined by one's residence.

There is one junior high school in the commune, Collège Albert Einstein. Lycée de Villaroy, a senior high school/sixth form college, is in nearby Guyancourt.

Versailles Saint-Quentin-en-Yvelines University provides tertiary educational services.

See also
Communes of the Yvelines department
 Port-Royal-des-Champs

References

External links

 Home page

Communes of Yvelines
Saint-Quentin-en-Yvelines